Trish Bertram is a British television continuity announcer and voice-over artist.

Career
Bertram started her career in 1982 with London Weekend Television. She joined the pan-European satellite channel Super Channel in 1987 as an announcer and presenter.

Alongside colleague Glen Thompsett, she made the last announcement (a recorded in-vision link) on LWT's last night as an on-air brand on 27 October 2002.

Olympics
Bertram was one of the  Stadium Announcers for the Closing Ceremony of the 2012 Summer Olympics and  the Opening and Closing Ceremonies of the 2012 Summer Paralympics ceremonies in London with Marc Edwards.

Other work
Bertram provided narration for Raeyn St. Clare's album project Nightfaery.

References

External links
Official Site
Radio 4 Woman's Hour
Interview with Trish Bertram

Living people
British television presenters
Radio and television announcers
Year of birth missing (living people)